Herzberg (Elster) station is a railway station in the municipality of Herzberg (Elster), located in the Elbe-Elster district in Brandenburg, Germany.

References

Railway stations in Brandenburg
Buildings and structures in Elbe-Elster